Africa Tsoai (born 4 July 1967) is a South African actor and businessman best known for the role of Tsokotla on the soap opera, Mokgonyana Mmatswale and John Mapula on Skeem Saam.

Career
Afrika Tsoai has acted in most retro dramas and most notable for 80s drama Mokgonyana Mmatswale as Tsokotla, a young man who was a taxi driver and in love with an older woman. He is most famous for acting as John Maputla, the husband of Meikie Maputla and father of Leeto and Thabo Maputla in SABC 1's soap, ''Skeem Saam.

References

External links
 

Living people
People from Thaba Chweu Local Municipality
Northern Sotho people
South African male soap opera actors
20th-century South African male actors
21st-century South African male actors
1967 births